The Gringo Gazette is an English-language newspaper founded by Carrie Duncan, published every other week for the American expatriate communities in Baja California and Baja California Sur, Mexico. It has been published since 1995. Most of its contributors are Americans living in Mexico or Americans with a second home in Mexico. Most of the subscribers of this newspaper are located in San Felipe, La Paz and Cabo San Lucas.

The Gringo Gazette North is the Baja California edition of the Gringo Gazette and distributes to Rosarito Beach, Ensenada and other nearby towns on the Gold Coast.

See also

 List of newspapers in Mexico

References

External links
 Gringo Gazette North edition for Baja California
 Edition for Baja California Sur

American diaspora in Mexico
Baja California Sur
Newspapers published in Mexico
English-language newspapers published in North America
Biweekly newspapers
American expatriates in Mexico
Mass media in Baja California